Michael Zacpálek (born Kralupy nad Vltavou, February 21, 1991) is a Czech professional ice hockey player. He played with HC Sparta Praha in the Czech Extraliga during the 2010–11 Czech Extraliga season.

References

External links

1991 births
Czech ice hockey defencemen
HC Sparta Praha players
Living people
People from Kralupy nad Vltavou
Sportspeople from the Central Bohemian Region
Hokej Šumperk 2003 players
HC Berounští Medvědi players